Manic Street Preachers are an alternative rock band formed in 1986 in Blackwood, Wales, UK. Their discography consists of 14 studio albums, three compilation albums, four video albums, 71 music videos, six extended plays, 57 singles, 208 B-sides, plus appearances on various artist compilations.

For singles releases, the band has a record 34 UK Top 40 hits (two of which reached number 1), with a total of 97 weeks in the Top 40. The band has spent 179 weeks in the UK Singles Chart, with the longest unbroken chart run being "If You Tolerate This Your Children Will Be Next" with 17 weeks. 
Between 1996 and 2007, all of the band's singles charted in the Top 20 in the UK, starting with 1996's "A Design for Life" and ending with 2007's "Indian Summer".  The band also holds the record for most consecutive Top 40 hits between 1991 and 2010, starting with "Stay Beautiful" which peaked at number 40, and ending with "(It's Not War) Just the End of Love", the band's last Top 40 hit, charting at number 28 in the UK Singles Chart.

Of albums, the most successful is Everything Must Go (1996), which spent 102 weeks in the top 75.  This Is My Truth Tell Me Yours (1998) was the band's first number 1 album, having enjoyed 74 weeks in the chart. The band has released 14 studio albums, all of which charted within the Top 15, with the lowest being Generation Terrorists (1992) and Lifeblood (2004) which peaked at number 13. The band has a record of 240 weeks in the UK Albums Chart, 145 of those spent in the Top 40 in the UK.  After the UK,  the band has been most successful in Ireland and Finland, reaching number one in those countries, as well as in Sweden. Since Send Away The Tigers (2007), the Manic Street Preachers have achieved consistent top-five placements in the UK. Futurology (2014) and Resistance Is Futile (2018) both reached number two and The Ultra Vivid Lament (2021) was the band's first number-one album in 23 years.

Albums

Studio albums

Compilation albums

Extended plays

 A ^ Japanese-only release.

Singles

 A ^Japanese-only release.

B-sides

Box set

Video albums

Music videos

Official book

Documentary

Other appearances

Notes

References

Discographies of British artists
Rock music group discographies
Alternative rock discographies
Discography